Silverfleet Capital is a regionally focused European mid-market private equity firm.

Silverfleet is an independent firm, owned by its partners, and invests on behalf of a diversified group of international institutional investors. Silverfleet Capital specialises in mid-market private equity investment, having completed more than 128 buyouts in companies across Europe.

Silverfleet operates from offices in London, Munich, and invests in established businesses, with an enterprise value of between €25 million and €300 million, headquartered in the UK, France, German-speaking Europe, Benelux and the Nordic region.

Silverfleet invests in international companies operating in a number of different countries, where there is an opportunity to accelerate growth from buy and build and roll-out strategies. The firm is a specialist in three target sectors: healthcare, manufacturing and services, underpinned by extensive experience in technology-led transformation.

History 

Silverfleet has been investing in private equity deals since the 1980s, having previously been the private equity arm of Prudential Plc and operating under the name PPM Capital.

Formerly owned by Prudential fund manager M&G, Silverfleet Capital was itself the subject of a management buyout in 2007.

‘Buy and build’ is one of Silverfleet's key investment strategies, which has now become an accepted private equity industry term.

The firm is a member of the British Venture Capital Association and Invest Europe. In February 2011, Silverfleet became a signatory to the United Nations’ Principles for Responsible Investment (“UNPRI”), one of the first signatories from the private equity community.

References

External links 
 Silverfleet Capital website

Private equity firms of the United Kingdom